Elections to the Baseball Hall of Fame for 1989 followed the system in place since 1978.
The Baseball Writers' Association of America (BBWAA) voted by mail to select from recent major league players and
elected two, Johnny Bench and Carl Yastrzemski. The Veterans Committee met in closed sessions to consider older major league players as well as managers, umpires, executives, and figures from the Negro leagues. It also selected two people, Al Barlick and Red Schoendienst. A formal induction ceremony was held in Cooperstown, New York, on July 23, 1989.

BBWAA election 
The BBWAA was authorized to elect players active in 1969 or later, but not after 1983; the ballot included candidates from the 1988 ballot who received at least 5% of the vote but were not elected, along with selected players, chosen by a screening committee, whose last appearance was in 1983. All 10-year members of the BBWAA were eligible to vote.

Voters were instructed to cast votes for up to 10 candidates; any candidate receiving votes on at least 75% of the ballots would be honored with induction to the Hall. The ballot consisted of 41 players; a total of 447 ballots were cast, with 336 votes required for election. A total of 3,016 individual votes were cast, an average of 6.75 per ballot. Those candidates receiving less than 5% of the vote would not appear on future BBWAA ballots, but could eventually be considered by the Veterans Committee.

Candidates who were eligible for the first time are indicated here with a dagger (†). The two candidates who received at least 75% of the vote and were elected are indicated in bold italics; candidates who have since been elected in subsequent elections are indicated in italics. The 20 candidates who received less than 5% of the vote, thus becoming ineligible for future BBWAA consideration, are indicated with an asterisk (*).

The newly eligible players included 16 All-Stars, three of whom were not included on the ballot, representing a total of 71 All-Star selections. Among the new candidates were 18-time All-Star Carl Yastrzemski, 14-time All-Star Johnny Bench, 6-time All-Star Bert Campaneris and 5-time All-Stars Bobby Murcer and Gaylord Perry. The field included two Most Valuable Players (Bench, who won twice, and Yastrzemski), two Cy Young Award-winners (Ferguson Jenkins and Gaylord Perry, who won twice) and three Rookies of the Year (Bench, John Matlack and Bake McBride). The field also included some prominent Gold Glove winners: Jim Kaat, whose 16 at pitcher was the record until broken by Greg Maddux; Johnny Bench, whose 10 at catcher was the record until broken by Iván Rodríguez; and Carl Yastrzemski, who won seven as an outfielder.

Players eligible for the first time who were not included on the ballot were: Larry Biittner, Doug Bird, Tim Blackwell, Bill Castro, Larry Christenson, Bill Fahey, Ed Farmer, Don Hood, Mike Ivie, Dave LaRoche, Randy Moffitt, Jerry Morales, Rowland Office, Mike Phillips, Steve Renko, Aurelio Rodríguez, Elías Sosa, Jerry Turner and Otto Vélez.

J. G. Taylor Spink Award 
Bob Hunter (1913–1993) and Ray Kelly (1914–1988) received the J. G. Taylor Spink Award honoring baseball writers. The awards were voted at the December 1988 meeting of the BBWAA, and included in the summer 1989 ceremonies.

References

External links 
 1989 Election at www.baseballhalloffame.org

Baseball Hall of Fame balloting
Hall of Fame balloting